Frantisek Kolanda a spol., tovarna na automobily was a Czech automobile manufacturer.

History
Břetislav Novotný was one of the best known car designers in the country, previously designed both the  Novo and  Omega prototype before working with Zbrojovka Brno which produced cars under the brand name Disk. He departed from the company in 1925 and moved to Prague to construct his own car. From 1926 to 1927, he started designing a prototype at the workshop of the Varvařovský company in the Holešovice district. He moved onto another company, Košař with the body being produced in the Kobylisy district. Novotný and Košař were joined by Frantisek Kolanda, son of a Prague printing family and was in charge of the commercial affairs. With now enough funding, the company moved to a new location over at the Karlín district. The company was then renamed to Frantisek Kolanda a spol., tovarna na automobily. The brand name Enka (also spelled as EnKa and ENKA) was made by combining phonetic initials of Novotný and Kolanda.

Production ended in 1929 after about 20 (65 according to some sources) examples were produced.  Aero later took over the project and developed its first model, the Aero 10 (aka Aero 500). Around 4 examples are said to still exist with one in the collection of the  National Technical Museum in Prague and one with  Weymann coachwork.

Vehicles

Prototype
The first prototype was powered by a 350cc single-cylinder air-cooled engine with friction gears, before changing to a traditional three-speed transmission integrated in the rear axle. The wheelbase was no shorter than 3,000 mm. The open two-seater body had no doors and a fake grille to cover the air-cooled engine. The air-cooled engine was proven to be economical and had good climbing ability, reaching a top speed of  but was hindered by the poor ride quality due to the quarter-elliptical spring suspensions.

Production
The production version had a wheelbase of 2,150 mm, length of 3,100 mm, a width of 1,150 mm  (track width 1,000 mm) and a height of 1,400 mm. The engine had removable aluminium cylinder head and the pistons were also made of aluminium. It had brakes in the rear axle, centerlock wheels and fabric roof. It only had one door on the left despite the steering wheel being on the right as well as a mother-in-law seat in the back. Standard features included an electric starter, headlights from Bosch and speedometer with clock. Options included shock absorbers, an electric horn and door lock. Customers could also request the car to have a hardtop with side windows, a pickup or van with closed loading bed. One example was built with  Weymann coachwork. Price for a hardtop three-seater was  23,000 Kc.

Literature 
 Harald H. Linz, Halwart Schrader: Die Internationale Automobil-Enzyklopädie. United Soft Media Verlag, Munich 2008, ISBN 978-3-8032-9876-8. (German)
 George Nicholas Georgano (Editor-in-chief.): The Beaulieu Encyclopedia of the Automobile. Band 1: A–F. Fitzroy Dearborn Publishers, Chicago 2001, ISBN 1-57958-293-1. (English).

References 

Motor vehicle manufacturers of Czechoslovakia
Defunct motor vehicle manufacturers of Czechoslovakia
Vehicle manufacturing companies established in 1926
Vehicle manufacturing companies disestablished in 1929